Comandante FAP Germán Arias Graziani Airport  is a regional airport serving the city of Huaraz, Ancash Region, Peru. It is currently not served by any airline due to the bankruptcy of the scheduled airline, LC Perú. It receives many private and charter flights. It does not receive large aircraft due to high terrain in all quadrants.

The Anta-Huaraz non-directional beacon (Ident: ATA) is located on the field.

See also
Transport in Peru
List of airports in Peru

References

External links
OurAirports - Anta
SkyVector Aeronautical Charts
OpenStreetMap - Anta

Airports in Peru
Buildings and structures in Ancash Region

An earthquake devastated this area on May 31, 1970 and the USAF sent crews down to help with the recovery.  Two USAF Combat Controllers were deployed to Anta, in the mountains, to convert an existing dirt roadway into a runway.  During the week or so that they were constructing the runway, supplies were airdropped in for the people in the region.  After about a week, aircraft were able to land with supplies and leave with injured.